Iris orientalis is a species of praying mantis found in Asia.

Range
Afghanistan, Java, India, Nepal, Pakistan (NW-Himalaya: Kulu Valley, Kangra ).

See also
List of mantis genera and species
Iris oratoria

References

Tarachodidae
Mantodea of Asia
Insects described in 1882